Douchy-les-Mines is a commune in the Nord department in northern France.

Geography 
Douchy-les-Mines located near the A2 motorway between Valenciennes and Cambrai. It lies adjacent to the south of Denain and is a part of the urban area of Valenciennes.

Demography and culture 
In 2015, Douchy-les-Mines had 10,783 inhabitants, an increase of 3.43% compared to 2010.

The city has two cinemas (Cinéma Jean Renoir and Le Cinéma de l'Imaginaire) and it hosts the Regional Centre of Photography.

Landmarks 

 Maingoval Park (Parc Maingoval)
 Le Château de la Barbière

Notable people 

 Charles Alexandre Crauk, painter (1819-1905)
 Jean-Baptiste Dupilet, French politician (1880-1952)
 Robert Mintkewicz, bicycle racer (born 1947)

Heraldry

International relations

Douchy-les-Mines is twinned with:
 Méguet, Burkina Faso
 Mielec, Poland
 Vila Nova de Poiares, Portugal

See also
Communes of the Nord department

References

Douchylesmines